The 47th Army Corps was an Army corps in the Imperial Russian Army. The core formation of the Russian Dobrudja Army.

Corps of the Russian Empire